Schleemer Bach is a river of Hamburg, Germany. It flows into the Bille near Hamburg-Billstedt.

See also
List of rivers of Hamburg

Rivers of Hamburg
Rivers of Germany